Novosedly is a municipality and village in Břeclav District in the South Moravian Region of the Czech Republic. It has about 1,300 inhabitants.

Geography
It lies in the Dyje–Svratka Valley, on the right bank of the Thaya River. The municipality is embossed with fruitful vineyards.

History

The first written mention of Novosedly is from 1276, when it was acquired by the convent in Dolní Kounice. The village was probably founded as a typical colonization settlement in the first half of the 13th century.

Severage damage was inflicted by the Hussites in 1426. As part of the possession of Drnholec, it fell to the House of Liechtenstein in 1395. Like Drnholec, it was parsoned from 1642 until 1848. In 1576 a market existed there, in 1771 an expositor, and in 1785 its own parish. In 1785 its graveyard was relocated away from the church.

In 1871 the railway line from Břeclav to Hrušovany nad Jevišovkou was built and in 1872 the line from Novosedly to Laa an der Thaya was added. In 1883 the cellar lane was established. In 1887 two thirds of the village were destroyed in a fire. A farmers market was held every Tuesday from 1872 onward, but was eventually suspended because of the larger market in neighbouring Drnholec.

After World War I the multi-ethnic state Austria-Hungary was split up. By the Treaty of Saint-Germain-en-Laye, the municipality became part of Czechoslovakia and got its Czech name. Following the Munich Agreement German troops marched into Novosedly in October 1938. From that time onward the municipality belonged to the Reichsgau Niederdonau until 1945. After the World War II, the municipality fell back to Czechoslovakia. The German population was expelled and their properties were confiscated.

Demographics

Transport

Novosedly lies on the railway line from Břeclav to Znojmo.

Sights
The Church of Saint Ulrich is one of the few original Romanesque church buildings in the area. The original Romanesque phase was covered by Gothic and other modifications, but the Romanesque windows in the attic, found during the restoration of the church in 1946, were preserved.

References

External links

Villages in Břeclav District